Pablo Minelli (born 17 November 1969) is an Argentine swimmer. He competed in two events at the 1992 Summer Olympics.

References

1969 births
Living people
Argentine male swimmers
Olympic swimmers of Argentina
Swimmers at the 1992 Summer Olympics
Place of birth missing (living people)
20th-century Argentine people